Maria Amaral may refer to:
 Maria Amaral (sports shooter) (born 1937), Brazilian sports shooter
 Maria Adelaide Amaral (born 1942), Portuguese Brazilian playwright, screenwriter, and novelist
 Maria Lúcia Amaral (born 1957), Portuguese lawyer, university professor, politician and judge
 Maria do Carmo Estanislau do Amaral (born 1959), Brazilian botanist, biologist, curator, and academic